"Jesus wept" is a phrase famous for being the shortest verse in the King James Version of the Bible, as well as in many other translations. It is not the shortest in the original languages. The phrase is found in the Gospel of John, chapter 11, verse 35. Verse breaks—or versification—were introduced into the Greek text by Robert Estienne in 1551 in order to make the texts easier to cite and compare.

Context

This verse occurs in John's narrative of the death of Lazarus of Bethany, a follower of Jesus. Lazarus's sisters—Mary and Martha—sent word to Jesus of their brother's illness and impending death, but Jesus arrived four days after Lazarus died. Jesus, after talking to the grieving sisters and seeing Lazarus's friends weeping, was deeply troubled and moved. After asking where Lazarus had been laid, and being invited to come see, Jesus wept. He then went to the tomb and told the people to remove the stone covering it, prayed aloud to his Father, and ordered Lazarus to come out, resuscitated.

Luke's gospel also records that Jesus wept as he entered Jerusalem before his trial and death, anticipating the destruction of the Temple.

Text

Interpretation
Significance has been attributed to Jesus's deep emotional response to his friends' weeping, and his own tears, including the following:
 Weeping demonstrates that Christ was a true man, with real bodily functions (such as tears, sweat, blood, eating and drinking—note, for comparison, the emphasis laid on Jesus' eating during the post-resurrection appearances). His emotions and reactions were real; Christ was not an illusion or spirit (see the heresy of Docetism). Pope Leo the Great referred to this passage when he discussed the two natures of Jesus: "In His humanity Jesus wept for Lazarus; in His divinity he raised him from the dead."
 The sorrow, sympathy, and compassion Jesus felt for all mankind.
 The rage he felt against the tyranny of death over mankind.
 Although the bystanders interpreted his weeping to mean that Jesus loved Lazarus (verse 36), Witness Lee considered the Jews' opinion to be unreasonable, given Jesus' intention to resurrect Lazarus. Lee argued instead that every person to whom Jesus talked in John 11 (his disciples, Martha, Mary, and the Jews) was blinded by their misconceptions. Thus he "groaned in his spirit" because even those who were closest to him failed to recognize that he was, as he declared in verse 26, "the resurrection and the life". Finally, at the graveside, he "wept in sympathy with their sorrow over Lazarus' death".

In history 
Jesus's tears have figured among the relics attributed to Jesus.

Use as an expletive
In some places in the English-speaking world, including Great Britain, Ireland (particularly Dublin and Belfast) and Australia, the phrase "Jesus wept" is an expletive that some people use when something goes wrong or to express incredulity. In Christianity, this usage is considered blasphemous and offensive to devout Christians, being a violation of the second or third of the Ten Commandments. Historically, certain Christian states had laws against the profane use of the name Jesus Christ. The Harris Poll conducted a study that found that 90% of evangelical Christians would not view a film that used the name of Jesus Christ disrespectfully. In Catholic Christianity, the faithful pray Acts of Reparation to Jesus Christ for abusive use of the Holy Name, which constitutes being sinful.

In 1965 broadcaster Richard Dimbleby accidentally used the expletive live on air during the state visit of Elizabeth II to West Germany.

It is commonly used as an expletive in novels by author Stephen King. In his book On Writing, he explained that in grade school he was forced to memorize a verse from the Bible, so he picked "Jesus wept" due to its short length. Other authors using it as an expletive include Neil Gaiman in the Sandman series, Bernard Cornwell in the Sharpe series, David Lodge in Nice Work, Mike Carey in the Hellblazer series and The Devil You Know, Peter F. Hamilton in The Night's Dawn Trilogy, Mark Haddon in The Curious Incident of the Dog in the Night-Time, Dan Simmons in Hyperion Cantos, Minette Walters in Fox Evil, Elly Griffiths in the Dr Ruth Galloway series, and Jason Matthews in Red Sparrow.

This usage is also evidenced in films and television programmes including Lawrence of Arabia (1962), Get Carter (1971), Razorback (1984), Hellraiser (1987), Drop The Dead Donkey (1990), The Stand (1994), Michael Collins (1996), Dogma (1999), Notes on a Scandal (2006), True Blood, Cranford, The Bank Job (all 2008), Blitz (2011), Call the Midwife (2013), Community (2015), The Magnificent Seven (2016), The Haunting of Hill House, Derry Girls (both 2018),  Troop Zero (2019), and Silent Witness (2023).

Car journalist Jeremy Clarkson from the hit show "Top Gear", used the expletive many times across the duration of the 22 season run.

The verse is also used in the The's song "Angels of Deception" from the 1986 album "Infected." Kanye West uses the verse to end Bound 2, the last song on his 2013 album Yeezus.

See also

 Dominus Flevit Church
 Chapters and verses of the Bible#Statistics (including shortest verses)

References

External links
 King James Bible - Book of John, Chapter 11
 

Crying
New Testament words and phrases

Sayings of Jesus
Gospel episodes
Gospel of John